Ányelo Alvarado Hernandez (born 23 December 1985) was a Chilean footballer. His last club was San Antonio Unido.

References
 
 

1985 births
Living people
Chilean footballers
Cobresal footballers
Puerto Montt footballers
Deportes Concepción (Chile) footballers
Chilean Primera División players
Primera B de Chile players
People from Puerto Montt
Association football midfielders